Mount Trashmore is a 65 ft. hill located in Robert E. James Park in Evanston, Illinois.  Mount Trashmore is an example of landfill reuse as it was a solid waste landfill that was closed and converted into a park in 1965.

In 1973, Evanston began allowing skiing on Mount Trashmore, installing a tow rope and snow making machines.

Since skiing was prohibited in the 1980s, Mount Trashmore remained a popular sledding and tobogganing hill in the winter, as well as a popular destination for runners and hikers in the summer.

In the summer of 1995, Northwestern University football strength and conditioning director, Larry Lilja planted a small Rose Bowl flag at the top of Mount Trashmore and had the Wildcats repeatedly run up the mountain. They went on to play in the Rose Bowl on January 1, 1996.

References

External links
Evanston Parks and Recreation - Ice Skating and Sledding 
Originally made for PBS WTTW-Chicago, this is a rare clip of Orv Pibbs & Band, shot at Mt. Trashmore, in Evanston, Illinois 1983. https://www.youtube.com/watch?v=OoQpsAPDieM

Evanston, Illinois
Geography of Cook County, Illinois